Jalyn Holmes (born January 25, 1996) is an American football defensive end for the Chicago Bears of the National Football League (NFL). He played college football at Ohio State.

College career
Holmes played defensive end for the Ohio State Buckeyes from 2014 to 2017. Redshirting his Freshman year, Holmes played in every Ohio State game from 2015-2017, appearing in 40 total contests.  He was a two-time Big Ten all-conference honoree, racking up 85 career tackles, 15 tackles-for-loss, and 5 sacks.  During his time with the Buckeyes, he participated in two Big Ten Championships, including the 2015 College Football Playoff National Championship, and five bowl games, helping the Buckeyes go 4-1 in that stretch.

Professional career

Minnesota Vikings
Holmes was drafted by the Minnesota Vikings in the fourth round (102nd overall) of the 2018 NFL Draft. On May 5, 2018, Holmes signed a four-year, $3.191 million contract with the Vikings, including a signing bonus of $731,396. In week seven of his rookie season, he recorded his first career sack, coming against Sam Darnold in a 37-17 win over the Jets in New York.

On September 1, 2021, Holmes was waived by the Vikings.

New Orleans Saints
On September 6, 2021, Holmes was signed to the New Orleans Saints practice squad. He was promoted to the active roster on October 6, 2021.

New York Giants
On May 18, 2022, Holmes signed with the New York Giants. He was waived on August 30, 2022.

Chicago Bears
On October 4, 2022, Holmes was signed to the Chicago Bears practice squad. On January 4, 2023, the Bears signed him to the active roster.

References

External links
Minnesota Vikings bio
Ohio State Buckeyes bio

1996 births
Living people
American football defensive tackles
American football defensive ends
Chicago Bears players
Minnesota Vikings players
New Orleans Saints players
New York Giants players
Ohio State Buckeyes football players
Players of American football from Norfolk, Virginia